Gamebros is a Brazilian crime drama television series produced by Medialand and directed by Beto Ribeiro. It stars Leandro Mazzini, Ana Paula Lopez and Bruno Soares and follows the story of a hacker who works at the Federal Police's Homicide Division.

Plot 
The hacker Heitor Grillo uses his technology knowledge in service of the Federal Police's Homicide Division led by the police officer Patricia. What no one knows is that while Hector helps the police in the real world he goes undercover at the Dark web as the alias 'Gamebros' to defend the internet from malicious virtual criminals.

Cast 
 Leandro Mazzini	as	 Heitor
 Julio Oliveira	as	 Gael
 Marcelo Bechara	as	 Eduardo
 Ceçary Goldschmidt	as	 Gilda
 Felipe Hofstatter	as	 Roberto
 Ana Paula Lopez	as	 Patricia
 Emmilio Moreira	as	 Glauber
 Bruno Soares	        as	 Tiago
 Ricardo Ciciliano	as	 Eder

References

External links 

2010s Brazilian television series
2018 Brazilian television series debuts
Portuguese-language television shows
Brazilian crime television series
Brazilian drama television series
Television shows filmed in São Paulo (state)
Television shows set in São Paulo